RV10 may refer to:
 Mandala 10, the tenth mandala of the Rigveda
 RealVideo 10, a video codec
 Van's Aircraft RV-10, a kit aircraft
 Barricade RV-10, a toy in Hasbro's N-Strike series of Nerf Blasters